Aleksey Alekseyevich Kornienko (born 15 January 2003) is a Russian footballer who plays as a defender for FC Rostov.

Club career
He made his debut in the Russian Premier League for FC Rostov on 19 June 2020 in a game against PFC Sochi. FC Rostov was forced to field their under-18 squad in that game, as their main squad was quarantined after six players had tested positive for COVID-19.

References

External links
 
 
 

2003 births
Living people
Russian footballers
Association football defenders
Association football midfielders
FC Rostov players
Russian Premier League players